The 2010 12bet.com World Open was a professional ranking snooker tournament held between 18 and 26 September 2010 at the S.E.C.C. in Glasgow, Scotland. This was the first time that the World Open was sponsored by 12bet.com.

Ronnie O'Sullivan made the 73rd official maximum break during his match against Mark King. This was O'Sullivan's record 10th official 147, however he had to be persuaded by referee Jan Verhaas to play the final , as he became aware that there was no distinct prize money for a maximum break in the tournament and planned to end his break at 140. There was only a £4,000 prize for the highest break of the tournament.

Neil Robertson was the defending champion, and he retained his title by defeating Ronnie O'Sullivan 5–1 in the final.


Prize fund
The breakdown of prize money for this year is shown below:

Winner: £100,000
Runner-up: £40,000
Semi-final: £20,000
Quarter-final: £12,500
Last 16: £7,500
Last 32: £5,000
Last 64: £2,500
Last 96: £1,500

Stage one highest break: £500
Stage two highest break: £4,000
Total: £502,500

Field
The field of the tournament of 128 players was as follows:

96 professional players on the Main Tour
10 Rileys Club qualifiers:
Middlesbrough:  Richard Beckham
Dunfermline:  Marc Davis
Norwich:  Jamie Edwards
Leicester:  Ian Glover
Stevenage:  Sam Harvey
Guildford:  James Loft
Cardiff:  Allan Morgan
Preston:  John Whitty
Plymouth:  Matt Williams
10 independent club qualifiers:
South West Snooker Academy, Gloucester:  Sam Baird
Grove Snooker Centre, Romford:  Ryan Causton
The Ivy Rooms, Carlow:   Jason Devaney
Keynsham Snooker Club, Bristol:  Mike Finn
Castle Snooker Club, Brighton:  Anish Gokool
QE1 Snooker Club, Belfast:  Julian Logue
The Q Club, Glasgow:  Craig MacGillivray
Landywood Snooker Centre, Landywood:  Mitchell Mann
Northern Snooker Centre, Leeds:  James McGouran
The Q-Bar, Chester:  Chris Norbury

4 international qualifiers:
Bahrain:  Habib Subah
Belgium:  Mario Geudens
Germany:  Lasse Münstermann
Thailand:  Thepchaiya Un-Nooh
Top 2 amateur players on the PTC Order of Merit:
 Daniel Wells
 Michael Wasley
2 ladies tour players:
 Wendy Jans
 Anita Rizzuti
2 senior players:
 Darren Morgan
 Tony Knowles
2 youth players:
 Joel Walker
 Luca Brecel

Draw

Qualifying rounds
The first two rounds took place between 21 and 23 August 2010 at the World Snooker Academy, Sheffield. Eleven selected round three matches were held over until the start of the tournament in Glasgow. The rest took place at the Academy on 24 August. All matches were best of 5 frames. All times are BST.

Round 1
All amateurs and players ranked 65–96 entered at this stage.

Saturday, 21 August – 10:00
  Jamie Jones 3–0  Tony Knowles
  Matt Williams 1–3  Paul Davison
  John Whitty 0–3  Thanawat Thirapongpaiboon
  Noppon Saengkham 3–1  Luca Brecel
  Igor Figueiredo 3–2  Liu Chuang
  Liam Highfield 3–1  Michael White
Saturday, 21 August – 12:00
  Justin Astley 3–2  Michael Wasley
  Chris Norbury 3–0  Richard Beckham
  Adam Wicheard 2–3  James McBain
  Daniel Wells 3–1  Jamie O'Neill
  Jak Jones 1–3  Joe Jogia
  Patrick Wallace 3–0  Kurt Maflin
Saturday, 21 August – 16:00
  Jack Lisowski 3–1  Ryan Causton
  Xiao Guodong 3–0  James Loft
  Thepchaiya Un-Nooh 3–1  Reanne Evans
  Julian Logue 1–3  Joel Walker
  Mike Finn 0–3  Kyren Wilson
  Habib Subah 1–3  Darren Morgan

Saturday, 21 August – 18:00
  Mitchell Mann 0–3  Ben Woollaston
  Andrew Pagett  2–3  Kuldesh Johal
  Anish Gokool 0–3  Sam Harvey
  Patrick Einsle 2–3  Dermot McGlinchey
  Issara Kachaiwong 2–3  James McGouran
  Sam Baird 3–2  Zhang Anda
Sunday, 22 August – 10:00
  Anthony McGill 3–1  Ian Glover
  Mario Geudens 3–2   Jason Devaney
  Anita Rizzuti 0–3  Alfie Burden
  Allan Morgan 0–3  Liu Song
  Marc Davis 0–3  Matthew Couch
Sunday, 22 August – 12:00
  Wendy Jans 1–3  Simon Bedford
  Jamie Edwards 1–3  Craig MacGillivray

Round 2
Players ranked 33–64 entered at this stage.

Sunday, 22 August – 12:00
  Jamie Burnett 0–3  Adrian Gunnell
  Dominic Dale 3–1  Sam Harvey
  Ben Woollaston 3–0  Justin Astley
   Liu Song 3–1  Barry Pinches
Sunday, 22 August – 16:00
  Anthony Hamilton 1–3  James McBain
  Jimmy White 3–0  Michael Judge
  Dermot McGlinchey 1–3  Paul Davison
  Mario Geudens 1–3  Anthony McGill
  Tom Ford 1–3  Alfie Burden
  Paul Davies 3–2  James McGouran
Sunday, 22 August – 18:00
  Bjorn Haneveer 3–2  Joe Swail
  Thepchaiya Un-Nooh 3–0  Peter Lines
  Simon Bedford 3–2  Jimmy Robertson
  Liam Highfield 2–3  Fergal O'Brien
  Noppon Saengkham 0–3  Martin Gould
  Matthew Couch 3–0  Ian McCulloch

Monday, 23 August – 10:00
  Jimmy Michie 3–2  Mark Joyce
  Jamie Jones 3–0  Sam Baird
  Darren Morgan 3–2  Xiao Guodong
  Tony Drago 3–1  Joel Walker
  Joe Delaney 2–3  Thanawat Thirapongpaiboon
  Chris Norbury 1–3  Alan McManus
Monday, 23 August – 12:00
  Stuart Pettman 3–0  Kyren Wilson
  Matthew Selt 3–1  Lasse Münstermann
  Rod Lawler 2–3  Nigel Bond
  Marcus Campbell 3–0  Daniel Wells
  Jack Lisowski 1–3  Andy Hicks
  Rory McLeod 3–1  Kuldesh Johal
Monday, 23 August – 16:00
  Igor Figueiredo 3–0  David Gilbert
  Robert Milkins 1–3  David Morris
  Patrick Wallace 1–3  Joe Jogia
  Craig MacGillivray 0–3  James Wattana

Round 3
The top 32 players in the rankings entered the tournament at this stage.

Tuesday, 24 August – 10:00
  Judd Trump 3–0  Thanawat Thirapongpaiboon
  Marco Fu 3–2  Alfie Burden
  Matthew Selt 0–3  Martin Gould
  Fergal O'Brien 3–1  Dominic Dale
Tuesday, 24 August – 12:00
  Ricky Walden 3–1  Andy Hicks
  Darren Morgan 2–3  Matthew Stevens
  Andrew Higginson 3–1  Liang Wenbo
  Gerard Greene 2–3  Joe Jogia
  Marcus Campbell 3–1  Simon Bedford
  Liu Song 3–1  Michael Holt
Tuesday, 24 August – 16:00
  Alan McManus 3–0  Anthony McGill
  James Wattana 2–3  Jimmy Michie
  Rory McLeod 1–3  Nigel Bond
  Mark Davis 3–0  Jamie Jones
  Tony Drago 1–3  Stephen Lee
  Mike Dunn 3–1  Ryan Day
Tuesday, 24 August – 18:00
  David Morris 3–0  Ben Woollaston
  Mark Allen 2–3  James McBain
 
Tuesday, 24 August – 18:00
  Matthew Couch 3–0  Paul Davies
  Ken Doherty 3–2  Joe Perry
  Stuart Bingham 2–3  Jamie Cope
Saturday, 18 September – 14:30
  Neil Robertson 3–1  Graeme Dott
  Ali Carter 3–1   Thepchaiya Un-Nooh
  Stuart Pettman 2–3  Stephen Maguire
Saturday, 18 September – not before 19:00
  Steve Davis 1–3  Peter Ebdon
  Shaun Murphy 0–3  Dave Harold
Sunday, 19 September – 14:00
  Stephen Hendry 3–0  Bjorn Haneveer
  Mark Williams  3–0  Igor Figueiredo
  Ding Junhui 3–0  Adrian Gunnell
Sunday, 19 September – not before 19:00
  Paul Davison 1–3  Jimmy White
  Mark Selby 2–3  Barry Hawkins
Monday, 20 September – 12:30
  Mark King 0–3  Ronnie O'Sullivan

Main rounds
Matches were played on a roll-on/roll-off basis. Play started at the allocated time each day with a 15-minute interval between matches. The evening session did not start before the time indicated on the format.

The draw up to and including the semi-finals were made on a random basis. All matches up to and including the semi-finals were best of 5 frames and the final was best of 9 frames. All times are BST.

Last 32

Monday, 20 September – 12:30
  Matthew Stevens 2–3  Alan McManus
  Joe Jogia 1–3  Liu Song
Monday, 20 September – 19:00
  Jamie Cope 3–2  Dave Harold
  Mike Dunn 1–3  Marcus Campbell
Tuesday, 21 September – 13:00
  Ali Carter 1–3  Mark Williams
  Ding Junhui 3–1  Jimmy Michie
  Stephen Lee 3–2  Nigel Bond
Tuesday, 21 September – 19:00
  Stephen Hendry 3–0  Mark Davis
  Peter Ebdon 3–2  Fergal O'Brien

Wednesday, 22 September – 12:30
  Neil Robertson 3–1  David Morris
Wednesday, 22 September – not before 14:00
  Barry Hawkins 3–1  Ken Doherty
  James McBain 0–3  Ricky Walden
Wednesday, 22 September – 19:00
  Judd Trump 2–3  Stephen Maguire
  Martin Gould 3–0  Matthew Couch
Thursday, 23 September – 12:30
  Ronnie O'Sullivan 3–1  Jimmy White
  Marco Fu 1–3  Andrew Higginson

Last 16

Thursday, 23 September – 12:30
  Marcus Campbell 0–3  Ding Junhui
Thursday, 23 September – 19:00
  Mark Williams 3–2  Barry Hawkins
  Peter Ebdon 3–2  Liu Song

Friday, 24 September – 12:30
  Jamie Cope 1–3  Ricky Walden
  Stephen Hendry 1–3  Ronnie O'Sullivan
  Alan McManus 0–3  Stephen Maguire
Friday, 24 September – 19:00
  Neil Robertson 3–2  Andrew Higginson
  Stephen Lee  0–3  Martin Gould

Quarter-finals

Saturday, 25 September – 13:00
  Mark Williams 3–2  Ding Junhui
  Peter Ebdon 3–1  Martin Gould

Saturday, 25 September – 19:00
  Ronnie O'Sullivan 3–1  Stephen Maguire
  Ricky Walden 1–3  Neil Robertson

Semi-finals

Sunday, 26 September – 14:00
  Peter Ebdon 1–3  Ronnie O'Sullivan
  Mark Williams 2–3  Neil Robertson

Final

Century breaks

Main stage centuries 

 147, 135, 116  Ronnie O'Sullivan
 132  Stephen Maguire
 129  Fergal O'Brien
 127  Barry Hawkins
 112  Mark Williams
 110, 109  Ding Junhui
 109  Mark Selby
 107, 103, 101  Neil Robertson
 107  Liu Song
 102  Ricky Walden

Qualifying stage centuries 

 139  Joe Swail
 122  Mark Davis
 115  Thepchaiya Un-Nooh
 113  Fergal O'Brien
 113  James McBain
 108  Anthony McGill
 108  Judd Trump
 108  Mark Allen
 105  Jamie Cope
 104  Liu Song
 104  Matthew Stevens
 103  Ricky Walden
 101  David Morris

References

External links

2010
World Open
World Open (snooker)
World Open (snooker)
Snooker competitions in Scotland